Värtabanan is a railway just north of urban Stockholm, from Tomteboda via Norra Djurgården to Värtahamnen. It is nowadays mainly used for freight traffic linking Stockholm to the container port at Frihamnen, although a passenger service was operated on this line until 1913. A train ferry service also operated on Värtabanan between 1967 and 1975 (Stockholm – Naantali) and again from 1989 until the start of 2012 (Stockholm – Turku).

Gallery

Sources

Rail transport in Stockholm
Railway lines in Sweden